May Khin Ya Min (born 11 January 1986) is a Burmese footballer who plays as a goalkeeper. She has been a member of the Myanmar women's national team.

International career
May Khin Ya Min capped for Myanmar at senior level during the 2010 AFC Women's Asian Cup (and its qualification) and the 2014 AFC Women's Asian Cup qualification.

See also
List of Myanmar women's international footballers

References

1986 births
Living people
Women's association football goalkeepers
Burmese women's footballers
People from Mandalay Region
Myanmar women's international footballers